Show N Prove, born Ellis Taylor, is a Scottish music producer, DJ and musical artist from Edinburgh, Scotland.

Music production career 
Show N Prove's career began when working with local acts in the Edinburgh hip hop scene in the early 2000s, where he received a breakthrough working with rapper Baby Blue by producing the track "Sometimes".  This led to him moving to London where he worked with artists such as Rizzle Kicks, Tinchy Stryder, Wretch 32, Dappy and Benny Banks with whom he created his most successful work to date by producing the single "Bada Bing" which featured in the movie Fast & Furious 6 and appeared on the official soundtrack. Show N Prove is currently signed to AATW/Universal Records.

DJing 
Show N Prove started DJing at an early age and eventually began doing shows from the age of 14 around Edinburgh.

Single Releases

Mixtape Releases

Remixing 
A Show N Prove remix is on the official Jessie J single "Wild".  He also has an official remix on the Stooshe single "Black Heart".

Discography

References

External links 
 BBC Music Artist Profile

Living people

Year of birth missing (living people)

Scottish DJs
Scottish record producers
Electronic dance music DJs